Sinywagale is a village in Madaya Township in Pyin Oo Lwin District in the Mandalay Division of central Myanmar. It lies approximately 15 kilometres north of Mandalay city.

References

External links
Maplandia World Gazetteer

Populated places in Pyin Oo Lwin District
Madaya Township